Sto:lo Nation Tribal Council may refer to one of two tribal councils of the Sto:lo people:

Sto:lo Nation
Stó:lō Tribal Council